Sentence arrangement is the location of ideas and the placement of emphasis within a sentence. Based on these factors, a sentence may be classified as loose, balanced, periodic, or cumulative.

Examples
A loose sentence expresses the main thought near the beginning and adds explanatory material as needed.
We bashed the piñata for 15 minutes without denting it, although we at least avoided denting one another's craniums and, with masks raised, finally pried the candy out with a screwdriver.

A cumulative sentence places the general idea in the main clause and gives it greater precision with modifying words, phrases, or clauses placed before it, after it, or in the middle of it. In this example, the phrases eyes squinting, puffy, and always on alert look forward to the pronoun he in the main clause; the phrases after the word forest look back  to the word week in the main clause.
Eyes squinting, puffy, always on alert, he showed the effects of a week in the forest, a brutal week, a week of staggering in circles driven by the baying of wolves.

Grammar
Syntax